Rene Beauregard House, also known as the Malus-Beauregard House, is an 1830s porticoed mansion, an example of French-Louisiana architecture, overlooking the Battle of New Orleans battlefield.  The house is named after its first and last owners and served as a country residence for several wealthy people during the 19th century.

The property on which the house is located was part of the original Chalmette Plantation, but was subdivided by the St. Amond Brothers in 1832 and sold to Alexandrew Baron.  On the side facing the river, the property measured one arpent (196 feet) wide and 17 arpents deep, or approximately 15 acres.  Baron purchased the property on behalf of his mother-in-law, the Widow Malus, née Madeleline Panneteir. The house was constructed in 1833 or 1834 for the Widows Malus, and is a sixty-by-twenty-foot structure.  There are additional twelve-foot-deep galleries on the north and west elevations.

In 1880, Judge Rene' Beauregard purchased the property; it was retained by his family until 1904 when it was acquired by the New Orleans Terminal Company. In 1949, The National Park Service purchased the property and are its current owners.

Built in the classical style in 1832. The house was also known as "Bueno Retiro" 
the house later took its present name from Judge Rene R Beauregard.Presently located at the Jean Lafitte National Historical Park and Preserve the site of the battle of New Orleans.

History 
In St. Bernard Parish a mile below the City of New Orleans and adjoining the field of Chalmette where the Battle of New Orleans was fought in 1815, is the Rene Beauregard House, Originally called "Bueno Retiro" , the house was designed in 1840 by James Gallier, Sr., architect for the Marquis de Trava.

The house was subsequently occupied by "Judge Rene Beauregard, eldest son of General P. G. T, Beauregard of the Confederate Army, and J. A. Fernandez, who married the daughter of Alexander Lesseps, Judge Beauregard*s brother Henry also lived there, having purchased the Bonzano property next door to "Bueno Retiro".

The house represents a rather late development of the Louisiana plantation type. There is a colonnade of eight columns across both front and back of the house, the main body of which is only one room deep. The plan is extremely simple, there being four rooms to each floor. They owned many slaves.

In the latter deed the property is mentioned as "Bueno Retiro"  from Mrs. Alice Cenas Beauregard recites the derivation of her title by her from Octave Toca, September 24, 1888, and deed from Rene Toutant Beauregard recites derivation by him from Mrs. Carmen Fernandez, June 4, 1880. Mr. Fitswilson continues: We have been told the property is the Old Beauregard House, built by Gallier, Architect, for Marquis de Trava, and was called "Bueno Retiro" was purchased later by Judge Rene Beauregard, son of General G, T. Beauregard."  Next tract is the United States Soldiers Cemetery. Next, Ictienne Villavaso property. The succeeding properties became the home of Rene Beauregard, son of General G. T. Beauregard, after having been in possession

House construction and style 
Main house and columns of brick stuccoed. North wing brick, south wing frame. Slate roof with cypress framing. Plaster walls and ceilings.

The rooms at the northwest end are in a small wing, which was added at a later date than the original building, and which collapsed in 1937.

There is also a wing at the southeast end, apparently of the period of about 1890 and of a very bad design, detracting considerably from the appearance of the house which is otherwise good.

The walls of the house and the columns are of brick plastered and painted, the columns being white and the main

body of the house a sort of apricot color with green blinds and white trim. The roof of the house which extends out over the colonnade is quite unique, being a hipped red-purple slate roof with a very graceful low triple pitch. There are two dormers front and rear and one at each end, placed rather high in the roof. The detail is poor throughout the house.

Perhaps the most interesting detail of construction is the chimney. There are in reality two chimneys which by means of an arch in the attic are joined together and come out of the roof just below the ridge as one.

"The property, upon which what is known as the Rene Beauregard House is located, was conveyed to New Orleans Terminal Company in 1904 in two parcels."

It is also said that the property was once owned by Augustin Ma Carte, a rich planter, at the time of the three "battles of New Orleans, and was used by General Andrew Jackson as headquarters. The Battle of New Orleans was fought in 1815.

Reported condition as of 1937 
Poor. North wing has collapsed. Wings at each end of house are additions, Entire first floor has rotted out, Walls, roof and columns of main house are still in good condition. Number of Stories Two stories with attic.

Rene Beauregard House restoration 
Purchased by the National Park Service in 1949. Even though this house has had much time without residents, the National Park Service restored the mansion in 1965 at a cost of $247,000 dollars all which was donated by prominent families from St Bernard Parish, including John J. Janusa, Anthony Mistrot and the Colomb Family making up the bulk of donations and is now part of the Chalmette National Battlefield.

The battlefield, located in St. Bernard Parish to the southeast of the Lower Ninth Ward that was decimated by the storm, is bordered by one of the levees that were breached during the category five hurricane in 2005.

While the damage was not as catastrophic as it was for much of the local community, the historic battlefield suffered substantial damage.

Katrina flooded the entire parish of St. Bernard with 2–22 feet of water due to overtopping and levee breaches of the Mississippi River-Gulf Outlet (MRGO) in St. Bernard Parish and Industrial Canal in the lower 9th Ward of Orleans Parish. This resulted in the complete ruin of the park’s visitor center and substantial damage to other structures including the historic Malus-Beauregard House, the Chalmette Monument, and Chalmette National Cemetery. The nearby Mississippi River levee was not overtopped or breached at any time during or after Katrina. MRGO has been dammed and the levees strengthened, however, all the land is sinking due to soil subsidence, saltwater intrusion, and levees blocking silt deposition.

References 

Buildings and structures in St. Bernard Parish, Louisiana
French colonial architecture
Houses completed in 1832